Membury services is a motorway service station on the M4 motorway, located on the original site of RAF Membury in the civil parish of Lambourn in the English county of Berkshire, on the edge of the border with Wiltshire,  west of Junction 14. It is owned by Welcome Break and is situated adjacent to the Membury Radio Mast.

History
The service area was built by Ross Group, after Leicester Forest East, with Hartshead Moor services.

Construction
The services were built by Monk. Planning consent had been given in July 1970.

Food
It was designed by Howard V Lobb, to have three restaurants
 truckers, 80 seats
 general self-service cafeteria area, 180 seats
 grill room, with waitress service, 120 seats

Opening
It opened for petrol and toilets in February 1972, the eastbound side only, but there were no meals until October 1972. The westbound side opened on Thursday 15 June 1972, with a snack bar, in a portakabin. By March 1973, it was announced that the full service area would open at the end of May 1973.

On 22 December 1971, a fifty-mile stretch of the M4 was opened between Badbury, Wiltshire near Swindon, and the Holyport Interchange on the A423(M); the M4 section was opened at 11am by Michael Heseltine, and his daughter Alexandria, at the Holyport Interchange. The M4 section was the longest stretch of motorway to be opened, in England, since the M1 in 1959. The service area is on the Theale to Shefford Woodlands section, being sixteen and a half miles long; the route was announced in December 1966, but altered in November 1967 after objections. The only services on the M4 in December 1971 were at Heston and Aust; Membury would open in February 1972; more service areas had been planned, but never built. The Winnersh Interchange would not be opened in December 1971, with the two-and-a-half mile A329(M), until early 1973.

Buildings
Shell would run the pumps.

Planned services on the M4
Other M4 service areas were planned at Warren Copse near Shurlock Row and Waltham St Lawrence (B3018), Furze Hill (B4009, Hermitage, Berkshire), and Ashes Copse near Bradfield, Berkshire; in June 1972, Berkshire County Council looked at Upper Wood Farm on Cutbush Lane in Earley, owned by the University of Reading.

Facilities
Membury is one of five services which have a Starbucks drive-thru: the others are Fleet (Northbound only) M3, Warwick (Southbound only) M40, Hartshead Moor (Eastbound only) M62 and Gordano M5.

The service station is one of fourteen for which large murals were commissioned from artist David Fisher in the 1990s, designed to reflect the local area and history.

The services were constructed along with this section of the M4 between 1969 and 1971 by Arthur Monk and Co Ltd.

The Iron Age hillfort, Membury Camp, lies to the immediate southwest of the old airfield and the services.

References

External links 
Motorway Services Online - Membury

Buildings and structures in Berkshire
M4 motorway service stations
Welcome Break motorway service stations
Lambourn